Burak Demireğen (born 3 August 1993) is a Turkish footballer who plays for Gümüşhanespor. He made his Süper Lig debut on 18 May 2013.

References

External links
 
 
 
 

1993 births
Living people
Sportspeople from Ordu
Turkish footballers
Orduspor footballers
Süper Lig players
Association football defenders